1,3,5,7-Tetramethyl-1,3,5,7-tetrasilaadamantane is the organosilicon compound with the formula .  It is a colorless solid that is soluble in organic solvents.  The compound is one of the iconic carbosilanes, featuring alternating Si-C-Si linkages.  Otherwise it can be described as a diamondoid cluster.  It arises as one of many products from the pyrolysis of tetramethylsilane.  A more efficient route involves the reaction of the cyclic carbosilane  with aluminium tribromide.

References

Adamantane-like molecules
Carbosilanes